An Earthly Child is a Big Finish Productions audiobook based on the long-running British science fiction television series Doctor Who.  It is free to those whose subscription includes Plague of the Daleks.

Plot
The Doctor returns to twenty-second century London after his granddaughter Susan sends out a distress signal.  There he discovers the Earth enveloped in xenophobia, an alien invasion taking place and his rebellious great-grandson, Alex, in the middle of it all.

Cast
 The Doctor – Paul McGann
 Susan Foreman – Carole Ann Ford
 Alex Campbell – Jake McGann
 Holly Barrett – Sheryl Gannaway
 Marion Fleming/Hope – Leslie Ash
 Faisal Jensen/Reporter – Matt Addis
 Duncan – Ian Hallard
 President of the Earth Council/Policeman/Air Control/Helicopter Pilot/Reporter – Ian Brooker

Notes
Jake McGann is the son of Paul McGann.  He previously appeared with his father in the stories Immortal Beloved and The Girl Who Never Was.

External links
 An Earthly Child

2008 audio plays
Eighth Doctor audio plays
Audio plays by Marc Platt